R. Krishnan (1909–1997) and S. Panju (1915–1984), collectively referred to as Krishnan–Panju, were Indian film directors. The duo directed more than 50 films in South Indian languages and in Hindi.

Early life 
R. Krishnan was born on 18 July 1909 in Chennai, Tamil Nadu, India. Previously, he was in charge of the laboratory in Pakshiraja Studios (then known as Kandhan studio) in Coimbatore.

S. Panju was born on 24 January 1915 as Panchapakesan in Umayalpuram near Kumbakonam, Tamil Nadu. Previously, he worked as an assistant editor under P. K. Raja Sandow and as assistant director under Ellis R. Dungan. He was also a film editor who edited films under the name Punjabi or Panjabi.

Career 
They both worked for the Tamil film Araichimani or Manuneethi Chozhan (1942), which was directed by P. K. Raja Sandow in Kandhan Studio. Krishnan and Panju became friends at this time. Later, when Raja Sandow saw their skills, he gave them his next project Poompavai. The film Poompavai (1944) was their first directorial venture. In 1947, they directed Paithiyakkaran to support N. S. Krishnan's drama troupe, when he was jailed in the Lakshmikanthan murder case. After his acquittal, N. S. Krishnan also starred in the film. In 1949, they made Nallathambi, inspired by Mr. Deeds Goes to Town, in which C. N. Annadurai, who later became the Chief Minister of Tamil Nadu, debuted as a script writer. In 1952, they made Parasakthi, for which the dialogues were written by M. Karunanidhi, who also later became the Chief Minister of Tamil Nadu. Parasakthi became a cult film in Tamil cinema and influenced the emergence of the Dravida Munnetra Kazhagam, a regional party, as a political force in Tamil Nadu. They also made Hindi films such as Bhabhi and Shaadi. They received the Kalaimamani award in 1960.

Personal lives 
Krishnan has sons and daughters, among his sons is film director K. Subash, who died in 2016 at the age of 57.

Deaths 
On 6 April 1984, S. Panju died in Chennai. Krishnan did not make any films after Panju's death. On 17 July 1997, Krishnan died in Chennai.

Filmography

Awards
 Filmfare Award for Best Film - Tamil - Server Sundaram (1964)

References

External links 
 
 

20th-century Indian film directors
Film directors from Chennai
Hindi-language film directors
Indian filmmaking duos
Kannada film directors
Tamil film directors
Telugu film directors